Ramdas Tadas (born 1 April 1953) is member of 16th Lok Sabha representing Wardha in Maharashtra state of India. He was member of Maharashtra Legislative Council as member of Nationalist Congress Party. Later he moved to BJP in 2009 and contested Deoli Assembly seat of Maharashtra and loss by Ranjit Kamble. He was Vice President of Bhartiya Janata Party Maharashtra State Unit with President and Chief Minister Devendra Fadnavis.

He contested 2014 Lok sabha elections from Wardha (Lok Sabha constituency) as BJP /NDA candidate.

Positions held
 1985-1987, 1990-1995,1996-1998 : Chairperson, Deoli Municipal Council
 2007-2009 : Director, State Transport Corporation, Maharashtra
 May, 2014 : Elected to 16th Lok Sabha
 1 Sep. 2014 onwards : Member, Standing Committee on Information Technology

Sports & Clubs

Club - Maharashtra Kushtigir Parishad
Vice President- Maharashtra State Wrestling Council
Working President - Vidarbha Wrestling Association

References

People from Wardha district
1953 births
India MPs 2014–2019
India MPs 2019–present
Members of the Maharashtra Legislative Council
Living people
Lok Sabha members from Maharashtra
Bharatiya Janata Party politicians from Maharashtra